Atalia is a 1984 Israeli drama directed by Akiva Tevet.  It was adapted from a story by Yitzhak Ben Ner and mostly shot on location at Kibbutz Yakum.

Plot
Atalia (Michal Bat-Adam) is a 40-year-old widow who lost her husband in the Six-Day War and lives on a kibbutz with her adolescent daughter (Gail Ben-Ner).  Lonely and feeling outcast, she enters into a forbidden affair with her daughter's classmate, Matti (Yiptach Katzur), an idealistic 19-year-old who had been rejected by the army.  Atalia is independent-minded and non-conformist, so when her affair becomes known, the kibbutz leaders have the excuse they need to ostracize her. The slow degeneration of the once-idealistic kibbutz into a puritanical society, the strait-jacket of its conservative view of masculinity, and the conformity of her daughter all provide a backdrop to Atalia's problems.

Cast
Michal Bat-Adam as Atalia
Yiptach Katzur as Matti 

Gail Ben-Ner as Netta

Tamar Amiran

Significance of the name
The original Athaliah was a Biblical queen of Judea, whom the Bible presents as a tyrannical usurper and idolater. Used, though not commonly, as a female first name in Israel, Atalia is a secularist name associated with the sector of Israeli society which tends to rebel against old traditions and conventions and seek new ways. This meaning is obvious to Israeli audiences, and clearly has some relevance to the film's themes.

Critical reception
The film received poor reviews and poor attendance at the box office (only 80,000 tickets were sold).

References

External links

 
 Hebrew account and Bat-Adam's photo in the Israeli Film Fund website

1984 films
1980s Hebrew-language films
Films about the kibbutz
Films based on short fiction
1980s coming-of-age drama films
Israeli coming-of-age drama films
1984 drama films